The 2021 Cork Senior A Football Championship was the second staging of the Cork Senior A Football Championship since its establishment by the Cork County Board. The draw for the group stage placings took place on 29 April 2021. The championship began on 3 September 2021 and ended on 28 November 2021.

The final was played on 28 November 2021 at Páirc Uí Chaoimh in Cork, between Mallow and St. Michael's, in what was their first meeting in a final in this grade. Mallow won the match by 2-12 to 0-15 to claim their first championship title.

Mark Buckley was the championship's top scorer with 1-24.

Team changes

To Championship

Promoted from the Cork Premier Intermediate Football Championship
 Knocknagree

Relegated from the Cork Premier Senior Football Championship
 Bishopstown

From Championship

Promoted to the Cork Premier Senior Football Championship
 Éire Óg

Relegated to the Cork Premier Intermediate Football Championship
 St. Nicholas'

Group A

Table

Results

Group B

Table

Results

Group C

Table

Results

Knockout stage

Relegation playoff

Quarter-finals

Semi-finals

Final

Top scorers

Overall

In a single game

References

External link

 Cork GAA website

Cork Senior A Football Championship
Cork
Cork Senior A
Cork Championship